The Dippers is a comedy play by the British writer Ben Travers first performed in 1922 and based on his own 1920 novel of the same title. It premiered at the Royal Court Theatre in Liverpool before transferring to the Criterion Theatre in London's West End where it ran for 174 performances between 22 August 1922 and 20 January 1923. The West End cast included Cyril Maude, George Bellamy, Ernest Trimingham, Jack Raine, Hermione Gingold, Christine Rayner and Binnie Hale. Travers subsequently went on to pen a series of Aldwych Farces.

Synopsis
Henry Talboyes is stranded in a village and mistaken for a professional dancer and encounters the famous the American husband-and-wife dancing team The Dippers.

Adaptation
In 1931 it was adapted by Travers himself into the British film The Chance of a Night Time directed by Herbert Wilcox and starring Ralph Lynn, Winifred Shotter and Kenneth Kove.

References

Bibliography
 Goble, Alan. The Complete Index to Literary Sources in Film. Walter de Gruyter, 1999.
 Wearing, J.P. The London Stage 1920-1929: A Calendar of Productions, Performers, and Personnel. Rowman & Littlefield, 2014.

1922 plays
West End plays
British plays
Comedy plays
Plays by Ben Travers
Plays based on novels
British plays adapted into films
Plays set in England